The Gladstone Prize is an annual prize awarded by the Royal Historical Society to debut authors for a history book published in Britain on any topic which is not primarily British history. The prize is named in honour of William Ewart Gladstone and was made possible by a grant by the Gladstone Memorial Trust. It was first awarded in 1998, the centenary of Gladstone's death.

List of winners
Source:

1997 – Stuart Clark, Thinking With Demons: The Idea of Witchcraft in Early Modern Europe
1998 – Patrick Major, The Death of the KPD: Communism and Anti-Communism in West Germany, 1945-1956
1999 – Frances Stonor Saunders, Who Paid the Piper? The CIA and the Cultural Cold War,  
2000 – Matthew Innes, State and Society in the Middle Ages: The Middle Rhine Valley, 400-1000
2001 – Nora Berend, At the Gate of Christendom: Jews, Muslims and 'Pagans' in Medieval Hungary, c.1000-c.1300
2002
David Hopkin, Soldier and Peasant in French Popular Culture, 1766-1870
Guy Rowlands, The Dynastic State and the Army Under Louis XIV
2003
Norbert Peabody, Hindu Kingship and Polity in Precolonial India
Michael Rowe, From Reich to State: the Rhineland in the Revolutionary Age, 1780-1830
2004 – Nikolaus Wachsmann, Hitler’s Prisons: Legal Terror in Nazi Germany
2005 – Robert Foley, German Strategy and the Path to Verdun: Erich von Falkenhayn and the Development of Attrition, 1870-1850
2006 – James E. Shaw, The Justice of Venice: Authorities and Liberties in the Urban Economy, 1550-1700 
2007 – Yasmin Khan, The Great Partition: the Making of India and Pakistan
2008 – Dr Caroline Dodds Pennock, Bonds of Blood: Gender, Lifecycle and Sacrifice in Aztec Culture (Palgrave Macmillan: 2008)
2009 – Alice Rio, Legal Practice and the Written Word in the Early Middle Ages: Frankish Formulae, c.500-1000 (Cambridge University Press: 2009)
2010 – Natalie A. Zacek, Settler Society in the English Leeward Islands, c. 1670-1776 (Cambridge University Press: 2010)
2011 – Wendy Ugolini, Experiencing War as the ‘Enemy Other’: Italian Scottish Experience in World War II, (Manchester University Press: 2011)
2012 – Joel Isaac, Working Knowledge: Making the Human Sciences from Parsons to Kuhn, (Harvard University Press: 2012)
2013 – Sean A. Eddie, Freedom’s Price: Serfdom, Subjection, & Reform in Prussia, 1648-1848 (Oxford University Press: 2013) 
2015
Andrew Arsan, Interlopers of Empire: The Lebanese Diaspora in Colonial French West Africa (Hurst, 2014)
Lucie Ryzova, The Age of the Efendiyya: Passages to Modernity in National-Colonial Egypt (Oxford University Press, 2014)
2016 – Emma Hunter, Political Thought and the Public Sphere in Tanzania (Cambridge University Press, 2015) 
2017 – Claire Eldridge, From Empire to Exile: History and Memory Within the Pied-Noir and Harki Communities, 1962–2012 (Manchester University Press, 2016)
2018 – Matthew S. Champion, The Fullness of Time: Temporalities of the Fifteenth-Century Low Countries (University of Chicago Press, 2017)
2019 – Duncan Hardy, Associative Political Culture in the Holy Roman Empire: Upper Germany, 1346-1521 (Oxford University Press, 2018)
2020 – Caillan Davenport, A History of the Roman Equestrian Order (Cambridge University Press, 2019)
2021 – Tom Stammers, The Purchase of the Past: Collecting Culture in Post-Revolutionary Paris, c.1790-1890 (Cambridge University Press, 2020).

See also
List of history awards
Prizes named after people

References

First book awards
History awards
British literary awards
Awards established in 1998
1998 establishments in the United Kingdom
Royal Historical Society